Sapsiree Taerattanachai (born 18 April 1992) is a Thai badminton player. She claimed titles in the mixed doubles with Dechapol Puavaranukroh at the 2017 Southeast Asian Games and at the 2021 World Championships. Taerattanachai and Puavaranukroh made history as the first ever Thai pair to win the year-end Finals tournaments, the World Championships title and rank first in the world ranking.

Taerattanachai competed at the 2010, 2014 and 2018 Asian Games; and at the 2016 and 2020 Summer Olympics. In 2009, she was a semi-finalist in girls' doubles at the World Junior Championships, and the following year, she was runner-up at the Asian Junior Championships. She won gold at the Youth Olympic Games in Singapore. In 2014, Sapsiree became the first player ever to become a Grand Prix Gold finalist in all three disciplines. She won the women's doubles title at the 2012 India Open Grand Prix Gold, then the women's singles title at the 2013 U.S. Open Grand Prix Gold, then was runner-up at the 2014 U.S. Open Grand Prix Gold.  With her mixed doubles victory at the 2017 Swiss Open Grand Prix Gold, she did one better and became the first player to win Grand Prix Gold titles in all three disciplines.

Taerattanachai and Puavaranukroh won the silver medal at the 2019 World Championships, and a gold medal at the 2021 World Championships. The duo made a clean sweep of all three 2020 Asian Leg titles in Thailand, and all 2021 Bali leg titles and climbed to world number 1 in BWF ranking on 7 December 2021.

Personal life 
She graduated from Chulalongkorn University. Sapsiree is nicknamed "Popor". Her knee injury during the 2017 SEA Games Final was a minor speed bump to her long successful career. She has a made a very strong comeback in 2019 by producing extremely good results.

Career 

Taerattanachai and her mixed doubles partner Puavaranukroh reached their first ever final at a Superseries event in 2017 Singapore Open.

Taerattanachai and Puavaranukroh competed at the 2020 Summer Olympics, but they were eliminated in the quarter-finals.

Achievements

BWF World Championships 
Women's doubles

Mixed doubles

Asian Championships 
Mixed doubles

Southeast Asian Games 
Women's doubles

Mixed doubles

Youth Olympic Games 
Girls' singles

BWF World Junior Championships 
Women's doubles

Asian Junior Championships 
Girls' singles

Girls' doubles

BWF World Tour (14 titles, 8 runners-up) 
The BWF World Tour, which was announced on 19 March 2017 and implemented in 2018, is a series of elite badminton tournaments sanctioned by the Badminton World Federation (BWF). The BWF World Tour is divided into levels of World Tour Finals, Super 1000, Super 750, Super 500, Super 300, and the BWF Tour Super 100.

Women's doubles

 Mixed doubles

BWF Superseries (1 runner-up) 
The BWF Superseries, which was launched on 14 December 2006 and implemented in 2007, was a series of elite badminton tournaments, sanctioned by the Badminton World Federation (BWF). BWF Superseries levels were Superseries and Superseries Premier. A season of Superseries consisted of twelve tournaments around the world that had been introduced since 2011. Successful players were invited to the Superseries Finals, which were held at the end of each year.

Mixed doubles

 BWF Superseries Finals tournament
 BWF Superseries Premier tournament
 BWF Superseries tournament

BWF Grand Prix (4 titles, 9 runners-up) 
The BWF Grand Prix had two levels, the Grand Prix and Grand Prix Gold. It was a series of badminton tournaments sanctioned by the Badminton World Federation (BWF) and played between 2007 and 2017.

Women's singles

Women's doubles

Mixed doubles

 BWF Grand Prix Gold tournament
 BWF Grand Prix tournament

BWF International Challenge/Series (3 titles, 2 runners-up) 
Women's singles

Women's doubles

 BWF International Challenge tournament
 BWF International Series tournament

Performance timeline

National team 
 Junior level

 Senior level

Individual competitions

Junior level
 Girls' singles

 Girls' doubles

 Mixed doubles

Senior level

Women's singles

Women's doubles

Mixed doubles

References

External links 

 

 

1992 births
Living people
Sapsiree Taerattanachai
Sapsiree Taerattanachai
Sapsiree Taerattanachai
Badminton players at the 2010 Summer Youth Olympics
Youth Olympic gold medalists for Thailand
Badminton players at the 2016 Summer Olympics
Badminton players at the 2020 Summer Olympics
Sapsiree Taerattanachai
Badminton players at the 2010 Asian Games
Badminton players at the 2014 Asian Games
Badminton players at the 2018 Asian Games
Sapsiree Taerattanachai
Sapsiree Taerattanachai
Asian Games medalists in badminton
Medalists at the 2010 Asian Games
Medalists at the 2018 Asian Games
Competitors at the 2009 Southeast Asian Games
Competitors at the 2011 Southeast Asian Games
Competitors at the 2013 Southeast Asian Games
Competitors at the 2015 Southeast Asian Games
Competitors at the 2017 Southeast Asian Games
Sapsiree Taerattanachai
Sapsiree Taerattanachai
Sapsiree Taerattanachai
Southeast Asian Games medalists in badminton
World No. 1 badminton players
Sapsiree Taerattanachai
Sapsiree Taerattanachai